Peziza varia, commonly known as the Palomino cup or recurved cup, is a species of fungus in the genus Peziza, family Pezizaceae.

Description

Peziza varia can be identified by its growth on rotted wood or wood chips, its brown upper surface (at maturity) that is usually somewhat wrinkled near the center; a whitish and minutely fuzzy under surface; a round, cuplike shape when young, and a flattened-irregular shape when mature; attachment to the wood under the center of the mushroom, rather than under the whole cup; thin, brittle flesh (rather than thick and gelatinous) and smooth, elliptical spores that lack oil droplets.

The cup at first is pale brown or whitish overall, the under surface minutely fuzzy and the upper surface smoother, with a tiny stem-like structure. In maturity it is flattened-irregular or bent backwards, 2–12 cm across, the margin often splitting, upper surface brown and smooth, often "pinched" or somewhat wrinkled over the center, under surface whitish and minutely fuzzy, attached to the substrate centrally, without a stem. It has no odor. The flesh is brownish or pale, and brittle.

Peziza means a sort of mushroom without a root or stalk.  

Microscopic features: Spores 11–16 x 6–10 µm; smooth; elliptical; without oil droplets. Asci eight-spored; up to 225 x 15 µm.

Similar species 
Similar species include Peziza arvernensis, P. domiciliana, P. vesiculosa, and P. violacea.

Peziza repanda, Peziza cerea and Peziza micropus are synonyms.

Ecology 
Well decayed logs may sport the Palomino cup fungus, which is saprobic, usually on the wood of hardwoods. Soil rich in decayed wood and occasionally that which is covered with wood chips may support Palomino cup; growing alone, gregariously, or in clusters. This member of the cup fungi is commonly found in colder weather (spring and autumn in temperate regions), but sometimes appearing in summer.

Edibility
Peziza varia is nonpoisonous but inedible.

Distribution 
Peziza varia is widely distributed throughout America and Europe.

References

External links
Spore release
Wild about Britain

Pezizaceae
Fungi described in 1789
Fungi of North America
Fungi of Europe
Inedible fungi